Absence deformity of leg-cataract syndrome is a very rare genetic limb malformation which is characterized by unilateral absence deformity, scoliosis, low stature, and optic nerve dysplasia-associated congenital cataract. It has been described in two distantly related kin of Amish descent.

References 

Syndromes affecting stature
Congenital disorders of musculoskeletal system
Rare genetic syndromes